El Maragha is a city in the Sohag Governorate in Upper Egypt. It is located on the west bank of the Nile.

Etymology 
This claim is also supported by a Coptic translation of this toponym.

History 
El Maragha witnessed many historical events; the most prominent one is the battle of Barrod, in which a French flotilla was captured and its crew were killed on 3 March 1799.

Notable people
Mustafa al-Maraghi

References

Populated places in Sohag Governorate